Stab Wounds is an album by German melodic black metal band Dark Fortress which was released on June 11, 2004. The whole layout and cover art of the booklet has been designed by Travis Smith. A strictly limited 2-LP Vinyl version was released in December 2004 by the new German label Imperium Productions.

Track listing
 "Iconoclasm Omega" - 6:41
 "Self Mutilation" - 6:45
 "Stab Wounds" - 8:11
 "When 1000 Crypts Awake" - 4:00
 "Despise the "Living"" - 5:36
 "A Midnight Poem" - 8:47
 "Rest in Oblivion" - 8:29
 "Vanitas...No Horizons" - 1:24
 "Like a Somnambulist in Daylight's Fire" - 7:52
 "Sleep!" - 3:16

Total playing time	69:22

Digipak bonus tracks
 "Endtime" (Katatonia cover) - (8:21)

Vinyl bonus tracks
 "I Am the Black Wizards" (Emperor cover)
 "The Cryptic Winterforest"
 "Towards Immortality"

Personnel
 Azathoth - vocals
 Asvargr - guitar
 V. Santura - guitar, mixing
 Draug - bass guitar
 Paymon - keyboard
 Seraph - drums
 Travis Smith - art designs

Guest appearances
  Adimiron (Angst) and Jens Rydén (Naglfar) did some of the vocals on the song Rest in Oblivion.
  Herr Morbid (Forgotten Tomb) did some of the vocals on the song Like a Somnambulist in Daylight's Fire.

Cultural reference
The sample "Manche Menschen sagen ich bin ein Psycho... und sie haben recht, ich bin ein Psycho! Sehen Sie mich an." at the beginning of the song Self Mutilation is from the film The Sixth Sense.

External links
 Encyclopaedia Metallum

References

2004 albums